Wayne Laroche is an American politician. He serves as a Republican member for the Franklin-5 district of the Vermont House of Representatives.

Life and career 
Laroche was born in Sheldon, Vermont. He attended Bellows Free Academy, graduating in 1968. Laroche also attended the University of Maine, where he earned his Bachelor of Science degree in 1972. He received a Master of Science from California State Polytechnic University in 1986.

Laroche was a marine biologist studying the developmental biology of marine fish at universities. In the 2000s, he was appointed by the 80th Governor of Vermont, Jim Douglas, to serve as the commissioner for the Vermont Department of Wildlife. He served for eight years.

In 2022, Laroche was appointed by Phil Scott to represent the Franklin-5 district of the Vermont House of Representatives following the resignation of Paul Martin.

References 

Living people
Year of birth missing (living people)
Republican Party members of the Vermont House of Representatives
21st-century American politicians
University of Maine alumni
California State Polytechnic University, Humboldt alumni
American marine biologists